Catopta eberti is a moth in the family Cossidae. It was described by Franz Daniel in 1964. It is found in Afghanistan.

References

Moths described in 1964
Catoptinae